The 2022 Hull City Council election took place on 5 May 2022 to elect members of Hull City Council. This is on the same day as other local elections.

Following a review of Ward boundaries by the Local Government Boundary Commission for England (LGBCE) the whole council was elected in 2018, the first placed winning candidate at that election is up for re-election in 2022. The Labour Party was defending overall control of the council by a single seat after Labour councillor Julia Conner defected to the Liberal Democrats, on 3 March 2022. There were no elections in Ings or Kingswood wards, being two member wards and not being on this round of the three-year cycle.

The Liberal Democrats won control of the council, ending 10 years of Labour administration.

Council results

Ward results

Source:

Swings are as compared to 2021 while holds are compared to the last time the set of candidates sought re-election (i.e. 2018).

Turnout figures where stated are the number of ballot papers handed out in a ward including any rejected ballot papers.

Avenue

Beverley and Newland

Boothferry

Bricknell

Central

There was no election in Central ward in 2021, so changes are shown from the 2019 election.

Derringham

Drypool

Holderness

Longhill and Bilton Grange

Marfleet

Newington and Gipsyville

North Carr

Orchard Park

Pickering

There was no election in Pickering ward in 2021, so changes are shown from the 2019 election.

Southcoates

St Andrews and Docklands

Sutton

University

West Carr

References 

Hull City Council elections
2020s in Kingston upon Hull
Hull
May 2022 events in the United Kingdom